Patrycja Volny (born 5 February 1988) is a German-born Polish actress known for her role as Dobra Nowina in the 2017 crime film Spoor, the Polish entry for the Best Foreign Language Film at the 90th Academy Awards. She first appeared in 2012 legal drama television series True Law. She is the only daughter of the late Polish singer and songwriter Jacek Kaczmarski.

Filmography

References

External links

 

21st-century Polish actresses
Polish film actresses
Living people
1988 births